Aragón F.C., also known as Atlético San Juan de Aragón, is a Mexican football club that plays in the Liga TDP, is located in Mexico City and is affiliated with the C.F. Pachuca.

History
The team was founded in 2016, from that year it began to compete in the TDP League, but using the registration of a team called Azules de la Sección 26 situation that would remain until 2018. In 2018, the team changed its registration and began to use that of the Atlético San Juan de Aragón, which it has maintained since that year.

In the 2020–2021 season the team became the best club during the regular season of the TDP League, scoring 100 points during the 36 games of their group.

In the promotion stage, Aragón eliminated C.D. Chilpancingo, Club Carsaf and Sk Sport Street Soccer, until reaching the regional semifinals, where they were eliminated by Fuertes de Fortín F.C.

In July 2021 the team was invited to participate in the Liga Premier Serie B because it achieved the best records in the Liga TDP regular season, finally, on July 30, its entry into the league was made official.

On August 2, 2021, Ricardo Alba debuted in Liga MX with Atlético San Luis, making him the first player trained in this club to reach the highest category of Mexican soccer. On August 8, 2021, the team announced that it will not participate in the Serie B season for administrative reasons, so the team will continue to participate only in the Liga TDP.

Players

Current squad

References

Association football clubs established in 2016
Football clubs in Mexico City
2016 establishments in Mexico